Hydraschema leptostyla is a species of beetle in the family Cerambycidae. It was described by Lane in 1938.

References

Aerenicini
Beetles described in 1938